Ferenc Kirchknopf (9 June 1878 – 1 March 1949) was a Hungarian rower. He competed at the 1908 Summer Olympics in London with the men's eight where they were eliminated in round one.

References

1878 births
1949 deaths
Hungarian male rowers
Olympic rowers of Hungary
Rowers at the 1908 Summer Olympics
Rowers from Budapest
European Rowing Championships medalists
Sportspeople from the Austro-Hungarian Empire